Basit Ali (born 21 October 1991) is a Pakistani cricketer. He made his first-class debut for Karachi cricket team in the 2014–15 Quaid-e-Azam Trophy on 12 October 2014.

References

External links
 

1991 births
Living people
Pakistani cricketers
Karachi cricketers
Nugegoda Sports and Welfare Club cricketers
Cricketers from Karachi